"We in Here" is a song by American hip hop recording artist DMX, released in June 2006 as the lead single from his sixth studio album, Year of the Dog... Again (2006). The song features vocals and production from longtime friend and collaborator American record producer Swizz Beatz. The song is also known as a diss track towards his old label Def Jam Recordings.

Background
The song was produced by Ruff Ryder's producer Swizz Beatz, who also contributed vocals on the chorus, various ad-libs in between verses, and a short, introductory passage at the beginning. The beat contains the trademark Swizz Beatz siren throughout, as well as horn sounds and pounding drums. The song samples Clarence Reid's "Nobody but You Babe".

Rihanna diss
Towards the end of verse three, a short diss is sent towards Rihanna: "And for the record, what you gonna do to fill up my spot? I ain't gon' front, that Pon De Replay shit was kinda hot, not! How you gonna jack Will Smith for a beat, That's like tryna jack me for the streets! It ain't happenin'!", this was probably because Rihanna signed to Def Jam Recordings, the label DMX left because of creative differences.

Charts

References

2005 songs
2006 singles
DMX (rapper) songs
Swizz Beatz songs
Song recordings produced by Swizz Beatz
Songs written by Swizz Beatz
Ruff Ryders Entertainment singles
Columbia Records singles
Songs written by DMX (rapper)